Osornolobus is a genus of Chilean araneomorph spiders in the family Orsolobidae, and was first described by Raymond Robert Forster & Norman I. Platnick in 1985.

Species
 it contains seventeen species, found only in Chile:
Osornolobus anticura Forster & Platnick, 1985 – Chile
Osornolobus antillanca Forster & Platnick, 1985 – Chile
Osornolobus canan Forster & Platnick, 1985 (type) – Chile
Osornolobus cautin Forster & Platnick, 1985 – Chile
Osornolobus cekalovici Forster & Platnick, 1985 – Chile
Osornolobus chaiten Forster & Platnick, 1985 – Chile
Osornolobus chapo Forster & Platnick, 1985 – Chile
Osornolobus chiloe Forster & Platnick, 1985 – Chile
Osornolobus concepcion Forster & Platnick, 1985 – Chile
Osornolobus correntoso Forster & Platnick, 1985 – Chile
Osornolobus magallanes Forster & Platnick, 1985 – Chile
Osornolobus malalcahuello Forster & Platnick, 1985 – Chile
Osornolobus nahuelbuta Forster & Platnick, 1985 – Chile
Osornolobus newtoni Forster & Platnick, 1985 – Chile
Osornolobus penai Forster & Platnick, 1985 – Chile
Osornolobus thayerae Forster & Platnick, 1985 – Chile
Osornolobus trancas Forster & Platnick, 1985 – Chile

See also
 List of Orsolobidae species

References

Araneomorphae genera
Orsolobidae
Spiders of South America
Taxa named by Raymond Robert Forster
Endemic fauna of Chile